Air Marshal Richard John Duckworth, AVSM, VSM is a retired officer of the Indian Air Force. He served as the Air Officer Commanding-in-Chief (AOC-in-C), Central Air Command. He assumed the office on 1 July 2021 succeeding Air Marshal Amit Tiwari. Previously he served as Air Officer in charge Personnel at Air Headquarters Vayu Bhawan in New Delhi and Senior Air Staff Officer for the Western Air Command and Central Air Command.

Career
Richard John Duckworth was commissioned as a fighter pilot in the Indian Air Force on 29 May, 1983. In a distinguished career spanning 38 years, he has flown a variety of fighter and trainer aircraft with more than 3000 hours of operational flying.

With a long career of 38 years, he has commanded a front line fighter aircraft squadron and a fighter base. As an Air Vice Marshal, he served as the Assistant Chief of Integrated Defence Staff (Technical Intelligence). He is an alumnus of Defence Services Staff College, Wellington.

He is a Qualified Flying Instructor and has flown MiG-21 and MiG-29 fighter aircraft and has commanded a Mig-21 squadron on a front line base.

He superannuated on 30 June, 2022 and was succeeded by Air Marshal Amar Preet Singh.

Honours and decorations 
During his career, Richard John Duckworth was awarded the Vishisht Seva Medal (VSM) in 2008 and Ati Vishisht Seva Medal in 2021.

References 

Indian Air Force air marshals
Recipients of the Ati Vishisht Seva Medal
Recipients of the Vishisht Seva Medal
Year of birth missing (living people)
Living people
Defence Services Staff College alumni